Runa Khan is a Bangladeshi television and film actress. She won Bangladesh National Film Award for Best Supporting Actress for her role in the film Haldaa (2017). She also won Meril Prothom Alo Critic's Choice Award for Best Actress for her film Chitkini.

Works

Films
 Lalon (2004)
 Haldaa (2017) as Jui
 Chhitkini (2017) as Maimuna
 Gohin Baluchor (2017) as Shamima
 Kalo Megher Bhela (2018) as Rozie 
 Shapludu (2019) as Salma Begum

Television
 Family Crisis Reloaded (2022)
 Family Crisis (2019)
 Priyo Protibeshi
 Ochena Shomoy
 Sheuli Mala
 Jodio Shondha
 Pother Prante
 Tumi Ami Obosheshe
 Ek Ratri
 Ghor
 Avineta
 Pink Pearl
 Jol Chhobi
 Rong
 Shei Ami
 Nihshobdo
 Korban Alir Bank Balance
 Gunin
 Projonmo Kotha Bolche
 Mashrafe Junior
Sisimpur, a children's television show

Web series 
 Sabrina (2022)

References

External links

 

Living people
Bangladeshi film actresses
Bangladeshi television actresses
Best Supporting Actress National Film Award (Bangladesh) winners
Year of birth missing (living people)
Place of birth missing (living people)
Best Supporting Actress Bachsas Award winners